Lacrimosa (minor planet designation: 208 Lacrimosa) is a main-belt asteroid that was discovered by Austrian astronomer Johann Palisa on October 21, 1879, in Pola. The name derives from Our Lady of Sorrows, a title given to Mary, the mother of Jesus. The orbital plane is inclined at an angle of 1.7° to the plane of the ecliptic.

During 2003, the asteroid was observed occulting a star. The resulting chords provided a cross-section diameter estimate of 44.3 km. 10μ radiometric data collected from Kitt Peak in 1975 gave a diameter estimate of 42 km for this asteroid. It is classified as an S-type asteroid and is one of the largest members of the Koronis asteroid family. Hence it is probably a piece of the original asteroid that was shattered in an ancient impact that created the family.

References

External links
 The Asteroid Orbital Elements Database
 Asteroid Lightcurve Data File
 
 

Koronis asteroids
Lacrimosa
Lacrimosa
S-type asteroids (Tholen)
Sk-type asteroids (SMASS)
18791021